Lake Mooney formerly Rocky Pen Reservoir, is a 520-acre reservoir in Stafford County, Virginia. The lake has 33 miles of shore line, 40 million gallons of water enter the lake every day from the Rappahannock River. Mooney is the newest lake in Virginia.

History
The lake was opened in 2014. Lake Mooney Reservoir was named on May 29, 2015. The lake was named for Jason Mooney who was a Stafford sheriff's deputy who died in the line of work in 2007. The lake is primarily used as a long-term water supply reservoir for Stafford County, and is also available for recreation. The lake is stocked with game fish and officially opened for sport fishing in July 2017.

See also
List of lakes in the Washington, D.C. area

References

Reservoirs in Virginia
Bodies of water of Stafford County, Virginia
Tourist attractions in Stafford County, Virginia